Stephen Seymour (December 15, 1919 – June 20, 1973) was an American set decorator. He was nominated for an Academy Award in the category Best Art Direction for the film Louisiana Purchase. He was born in New York and died in Ventura, California.

Selected filmography
 Louisiana Purchase (1941)

References

External links

1919 births
1973 deaths
American set decorators
People from New York (state)